647 Adelgunde, provisional designation , is a stony asteroid from the inner regions of the asteroid belt, approximately 13 kilometers in diameter. It was discovered on 11 September 1907, by German astronomer August Kopff at Heidelberg Observatory in southern Germany. The origin of the asteroid's name is unknown, it may be derived from the name of Princess Adelgunde of Bavaria.

Orbit and classification 

Adelgunde orbits the Sun in the inner main-belt at a distance of 2.0–2.9 AU once every 3 years and 10 months (1,393 days). Its orbit has an eccentricity of 0.19 and an inclination of 7° with respect to the ecliptic. As no precoveries were taken, Adelgundes observation arc begins with its official discovery observation.

Physical characteristics

Diameter and albedo 

According to the space-based observations by NASA's Wide-field Infrared Survey Explorer and its subsequent NEOWISE mission, Adelgunde measures between 9.72 and 9.93 kilometers in diameter, and its surface has a high albedo of 0.488–0.514.

Based on the survey carried out by the Japanese Akari satellite, it measures 13.7 kilometers with an albedo of 0.26. The Collaborative Asteroid Lightcurve Link (CALL) agrees with the results obtained by AKARI, assumes a standard albedo for stony asteroids of 0.20, and calculates a diameter of 15.5 kilometers with an absolute magnitude of 11.41. As the diameters are typically inferred from the body's absolute brightness and its reflectively, a higher albedo results in a smaller diameter.

Spectral type 

Adelgunde is an X-type asteroid on the Tholen taxonomic scheme, while CALL assumes it to be a stony S-type asteroid.

Rotation period 

In August 2006, a rotational lightcurve of Adelgunde was obtained from photometric observations by astronomers Pierre Antonini and Antonio Vagnozzi. Lightcurve analysis gave a well-defined rotation period of  hours with a brightness variation of 0.28 in magnitude.

Name 

The origin of this minor planet's name is unknown. It is speculated that the name comes from a list created in 1913 by the Astronomisches Rechen-Institut (ARI) containing suggestions of female names from history and mythology for the naming of minor planets. At the time, the naming process was not well developed and the ARI feared inconsistencies and potential confusion. The list was sent to several German astronomers, including Kopff, with the invitation to name all of their made discoveries up to number 700.

Unknown meaning 

Among the many thousands of named minor planets, Adelgunde is one of 120 asteroids, for which no official naming citation has been published.

References

External links 
 Asteroid Lightcurve Database (LCDB), query form (info )
 Dictionary of Minor Planet Names, Google books
 Asteroids and comets rotation curves, CdR – Observatoire de Genève, Raoul Behrend
 Discovery Circumstances: Numbered Minor Planets (1)-(5000) – Minor Planet Center
 
 

000647
Discoveries by August Kopff
Named minor planets
000647
19070911